Nafpliotis is a Greek surname which means "descending from Nafplio" (toponymic surname). The female equivalent is Nafpliotou (. Notable people with the surname include:

Iakovos Nafpliotis (1864-1942), the Archon Protopsaltis of the Holy and Great Church of Christ in Constantinople
Ioannis Nafpliotis (born 1970), Greek sprinter
Maria Nafpliotou (born 1969), Greek actress

Greek-language surnames
Surnames
Toponymic surnames